Goettems is a surname of German origin, and is found mainly in the southernmost state of Brazil, Rio Grande do Sul. Outside of Brazil, the Goettems name is not common. However, there are other similar names within the German Brazilian community. The Goettems family originates from Saarland, Germany. Among the many German immigrants headed to Brazil was the "Goedems" family. Most other German immigrants were headed to the United States. The "Goedems" family established themselves in the rural area of Rio Grande do Sul, in the town of São Leopoldo.

Name Etymology and History
The name originally derives from Goedems. All members of the Goettems family in Brazil are descendants of Johann Goedems, born in Oberlöstern, Saarland, on September 17, 1798. After a thorough research of the family was completed, it was possible to trace back 5 generations before Johann, all the way to Christoph Gödems, born in 1650. Traditionally, in Germany, the name has always been Gödems or Goedems. Variations include Gedems, Geudems, Gödembs, among others. The first modification of the name from the "d" to the "t" was first recorded when Johann Goedems embarked in 1828 to Brazil.

Pronunciation
The traditional German pronunciation of "Goettems" is spelled "Quetems" in historical records.

Family History

Origins - Voyage to Brazil

Johann Goedems married on February 14, 1820 in Wadrill, Saarland to Magdalena Hassler. Magdalena was born on November 22, 1795, in Wadrill. In December 1828 the family decided to immigrate to Brazil. According to the "Kaiserlisch Brasilianische Bureau" of the Imperial Consulate of Brazil, Johann boarded the ship "Olbers" along with 767 others, under the name of John Goethems. He travelled in the company of his wife and his 4 children:
Johann Goedems (Jr.) (Born on November 4, 1820 - aged 9)
Johanna Goedems (Born on August 10, 1822 - aged 6)
Mathias Goedems (Born on July 23, 1824 - aged 4)
Anna Maria Goedems (Born on December 11, 1827 - aged 1 and 6 months)

They arrived in Rio de Janeiro on December 17, 1828, where after a few days of waiting they boarded the coastal ship Orestes to Porto Alegre. A second change to the name took place, this time from Goethems to Goetems. In the historical archives of the state of Rio Grande do Sul the family is registered, once again with a different name:
João Getems (age 30)
Magdalena Getems (age 32)
João Getems idade (age 9)
Jeanette Getems idade (age 6)
Mathias Getems idade (age 4)
Anna Maria Getems (age 1 and 6 months)

These new names were more "Brazilianized" and were better accepted in this new country.

Life in Brazil
The family soon established themselves on the eastern side of São José do Hortêncio, an area that belonged to the newly founded German colony of São Leopoldo, whose colonization had begun on August 24, 1824 with the first wave of German immigrants to Rio Grande do Sul. The life of these immigrants, in São Leopoldo, was extremely precarious at best. Each family received a plot of land of about 50 hectares. The plots of land were undeveloped and each family had to deforest their land so that they could build a ranch. In order to achieve this, they fought wild animals, and were even faced with the hostility of the natives which still lived a nomadic lifestyle in the wilderness. After a few years, each colonist already produced enough for their sustenance, and began exporting to the capital, Porto Alegre, located about 40 kilometers away.

On April 30, 1829 Johann's wife, Magdalena Hassler, died, according to the official register of the colony. Soon, João entered into a second marriage with Carolina Noschang, born in Boehl. She was daughter of Pedro Noschang and Ana Catarina Deutsch. From this marriage, João had 3 children:
Pedro Goettems, (Born on March 6, 1831)
Adão Goettems (Born on October 17, 1834)
Guilherme Goettems (Born in 1841)

Goettems Family During the Farroupilha Revolution (1830-1835)
During the revolution, the colonists of São Leopoldo, were almost involuntarily dragged into the conflict. While most were in favor of the central government, some were in favor of the Farroupilha Revolutionaries.
After research, the Goettems family was found registered in the conflict. A book, with registered names of people with apprehended weapons showed that João Quetemes (note the spelling error of the name due to pronunciation) had an apprehended gun, while his father-in-law, Pedro Noschang, had an old sword taken away.

After the Conflict

All indicates that the Goettems Family moved in 1847, from São Leopoldo to Santa Maria, Rio Grande do Sul. There, João and Carolina Noschang had 3 other children. One was a daughter named after her mother, and the other two were boys, Frederico and José. The move to Santa Maria was probably related to the famous João Adão (Moses) Noschang, Carolina's half-brother. He had had a busy life as a sailor, a merchant, and a soldier in the Farroupilha Revolution. After that he settled in Santa Maria, and later moved to Santa Cruz do Sul.

The following generations of Goettems went on to participate in such conflicts are the Paraguayan War.

Today
The Goettems Family is still around, the majority still in Rio Grande do Sul, although some can be found in other parts of the globe, even as far as New Zealand. The name Goettems ( either with the "t" variation or the "d" variation) no longer exists in Germany.

External links
For any additional information on the Goettems family or for more pictures, visit , (Please note: the website is in Portuguese).

References

Brazil
Ethnic groups in Brazil
 
German minorities